The South Bass Trail is a hiking trail located on the South Rim of the Grand Canyon National Park, located in the U.S. state of Arizona.

Access
The trail is accessible by use of U.S. Forest Service roads along the south rim of Grand Canyon.  The trailhead is located in a remote area of the park's south rim and is accessible from Rowe Well Road or Forest Service Road #328.  It generally takes 1½ to 2 hours to negotiate the 29 mile (47 km) trip from Grand Canyon Village, Arizona.  The road passes through the Havasupai Indian Reservation, whose government may collect tolls to pass through.  Directions are available from the park's Backcountry Information Center.  The trail begins at  elevation.  It ends at Pasture Wash Road, Forest Service Road #2515.

Description
The Tonto Trail crosses the South Bass Trail a mile from the Colorado River.  From this junction, to the west is Elves Chasm and the terminus of the Royal Arch Route, and to the east is the Boucher Trail and Hermit Trail, which provide access to the south rim via Hermit's Rest.

The trail itself is considered difficult.  No services are available, and the only reliable water is at the Colorado River, which must be treated before consuming.

History
At one time, this trail was connected to the North Bass Trail via a cable and platform that crossed the Colorado River.  The tramway no longer exists, and river crossing can only be made by raft.

See also
 The Grand Canyon
 List of trails in Grand Canyon National Park

References

External links

 Grand Canyon National Park, Official site

Hiking trails in Grand Canyon National Park
Grand Canyon, South Rim